The 1988 Citizen Cup was a women's tennis tournament played on outdoor clay courts at the Am Rothenbaum in Hamburg, West Germany and was part of the Category 3 tier of the 1988 WTA Tour. The tournament ran from July 25 through July 31, 1988. First-seeded Steffi Graf won the singles title, her second consecutive at the event, and earned $40,000 first-prize money.

Finals

Singles

 Steffi Graf defeated  Katerina Maleeva 6–4, 6–2
 It was Graf's 7th singles title of the year and the 26th of her career.

Doubles

 Jana Novotná /  Tine Scheuer-Larsen defeated  Andrea Betzner /  Judith Wiesner 6–4, 6–2
 It was Novotná's 3rd title of the year and the 6th of her career. It was Scheuer-Larsen's 2nd title of the year and the 4th of her career.

References

External links
 ITF tournament edition details
 Tournament draws

Citizen Cup
WTA Hamburg
1988 in German women's sport
1988 in German tennis